is a Japanese rechargeable contactless smart card ticketing system for public transport in Fukuoka Prefecture and environs. The Kyūshū Railway Company (JR Kyūshū) introduced the system on 1 March 2009. The name is an acronym of "Smart Urban GOing CArd", while  in the local Kyūshū dialect means "great". Like other electronic fare collection systems in Japan, the card uses RFID technology developed by Sony Corporation, known as FeliCa. American graphic artist Rodney Greenblat designed its official mascot, a frog with a clock.

On March 13, 2010, SUGOCA has been interoperated with two similar cards in Fukuoka—namely nimoca by Nishi-Nippon Railroad (Nishitetsu) and Hayakaken from Fukuoka City Transportation Bureau—plus Suica, a card used in Greater Tokyo Area by East Japan Railway Company (JR East). Additionally, since March 5, 2011, in a reciprocal agreement with Central Japan Railway Company (JR Central) and West Japan Railway Company (JR West), SUGOCA is also usable in Osaka-Kobe-Kyoto, Okayama-Hiroshima and Nagoya metropolitan areas. Similarly, the TOICA card of JR Central and the ICOCA card of JR West can also be used on JR Kyushu rail services.

Usable area
SUGOCA was implemented on March 1, 2009, in 124 JR stations in Fukuoka Prefecture, mainly in the Fukuoka-Kitakyūshū area. As of 2022 it's usable in a total of 124 stations of below lines.

Chikuhi Line: Meinohama to Karatsu
Chikuhō Main Line: (Fukuhoku Yutaka Line, Wakamatsu Line): Wakamatsu to Keisen
Hohi Main Line: Kumamoto to Higo-Ōzu, and Nakahanda to Ōita
de facto allow travelling between Higo-Ōzu and Naka-Handa if no alights of train on halfway stations
Ibusuki Makurazaki Line: Kagoshima-Chūō to Kiire
Kagoshima Main Line: Mojikō to Yatsushiro, and Sendai to Kagoshima (the currently whole line)
Karatsu Line: Karatsu to Nishi-Karatsu
Kashii Line (Umi-no-Nakamichi Line): the whole line
Kyudai Main Line: Kurume to Zendōji, and Mukainoharu to Ōita
de facto allow travelling between Zendōji and Mukainoharu if no alights of train on halfway stations
Miyazaki Kuko Line: the whole line
Nagasaki Main Line: Tosu to Saga, and Isahaya to Nagasaki (includes Nagayo branch)
scheduled to implement supports for Saga to Kōhoku section by 2024
Nichinan Line: Minami-Miyazaki to Tayoshi
Nippō Main Line: Nishi-Kokura to Kōzaki, Sadowara to Tano, and Kokubu to Kagoshima (except for Ryūgamizu)
Omura Line: Isahaya to Takematsu
scheduled to implement supports for Haiki to Huis Ten Bosch section by 2024
Sanyō Main Line: Shimonoseki to Moji (the whole line of JR Kyushu operation)
Sasaguri Line (Fukuhoku Yutaka Line): the whole line
Sasebo Line (from 2024): the whole line

Types of cards
There are currently three types of cards available. The SUGOCA ticket is available as either an Unregistered card, or as a Registered card, where the card can be reissued when lost. The second is the SUGOCA commuter pass (which requires registration), and the Excell pass, which can be used for non-reserved seats of limited expresses. The third form is the mono SUGOCA, which is functionally identical to the normal SUGOCA pass, but is patterned differently for the Kitakyushu Monorail. It was issued starting October 1, 2015.

Extended functionality
The card is also usable as an electronic money or cashless card in a few stores in Fukuoka prefecture, or to purchase beverages at some drink machines. It will eventually be usable in all 'ampm' convenience stores in Kyūshū. From July 22, 2014, Pasmo cards can be used to pay for Wii U Nintendo eShop digital video games with the NFC function of the Wii U GamePad.

See also
ICOCA (JR West: Kansai-area "Urban Network" and Hiroshima-Okayama metropolitan area)
Nimoca
Suica (JR East: Kantō area)
TOICA (JR Central: Nagoya metropolitan area)

References

External links 
  Official website

Fare collection systems in Japan
Contactless smart cards
Smart cards introduced in 2009
2009 establishments in Japan